József Bassa pen name: Miroslav (28 April 1894 – 25 January 1916) was a Slovene poet and Catholic priest.

Born in Beltinci, József Bassa was the brother of the writer Iván Bassa.  His parents were József Bassa and Anna Vucskó.  He published his poems (spiritual and secular works) in the Prekmurje dialect in Marijin list. Miroslav addressed modern literary experiments.

Literature 

See also 
 List of Slovene writers and poets in Hungary

Slovenian writers and poets in Hungary
20th-century Slovenian Roman Catholic priests
1894 births
1916 deaths
People from Beltinci
20th-century Hungarian Roman Catholic priests